Rikiosatoa fucataria is a species of moth of the family Geometridae first described by Wileman in 1911. It is found in Taiwan.

The wingspan is 38–43 mm.

References

Moths described in 1911
Boarmiini